Dr. Azizullah Lodin (Pashto: داکترعزیزالله لودین; 1939–2015) was the head of the Independent Election Commission of Afghanistan.

2009 Afghan presidential election
Following allegations of fraud during the 2009 Afghan presidential election which he oversaw, Presidential candidate Abdullah Abdullah called for the sacking of Lodin, saying that he had "no credibility". In the days prior to the release of the final election results, Lodin repeatedly met with President Hamid Karzai as the Afghan Independent Election Commission was challenging the findings of the auditors on the UN-backed Electoral Complaints Commission. Karzai rejected the call by Abdullah, stating "the changes would not be helpful to the elections and the country". He died at the age of 75 or 76 on January 4, 2015.

References

External links
Profile on Independent Election Commission of Afghanistan website

Afghan politicians
1939 births
2015 deaths